Lutetium(III) nitrate is an inorganic compound, a salt of lutetium and nitric acid with the chemical formula Lu(NO3)3. The compound forms colorless crystals, dissolves in water, and also forms crystalline hydrates. The compound is poisonous.

Synthesis
Dissolving lutetium oxide in nitric acid:

To obtain anhydrous nitrate, the powdered metal is added to nitrogen dioxide dissolved in ethyl acetate:

Physical properties
Lutetium(III) nitrate forms colorless hygroscopic crystals.

Soluble in water and ethanol.

Forms crystalline hydrates of the composition Lu(NO3)3•nH2O, where n = 3, 4, 5, 6.

Chemical properties 
The hydrated ytterbium nitrate thermally decomposes to form LuONO3 and decomposes to lutetium oxide upon further heating.

The compound forms ammonium hexafluoroluthenate with ammonium fluoride:

Applications
Lutetium(III) nitrate is used to obtain metallic lutetium and also as a chemical reagent.

It is used as a component of materials for the production of laser crystals.

References

Lutetium compounds
Nitrates